Julie Dray is a French actress. She is best known to international audiences for her roles in the Channel 4 sitcom Crashing (2016), the HBO and Sky One science fiction series Avenue 5 (2020), and the films Breaking the Bank (2014) and A Bird Flew In (2021).

Early life
At the age of thirteen, Dray won a magazine competition to interview a pop star. Through this experience, she was offered a job as a columnist, and used the money she made from the gig to pay for after school drama classes. Dray trained in acting at the Cours Simon and Cours Florent. In addition to French, she is fluent in English and Spanish as well as knowing some Hebrew and Norwegian.

Filmography

Film

Television

Video games

Stage

Awards and nominations

References

External links
 

Living people
21st-century French actresses
French expatriates in England
French film actresses
French stage actresses
French television actresses
Jewish French actresses
Year of birth missing (living people)